Section 1 is a high school athletic organization that is one of the eleven sections of the New York State Public High School Athletic Association (NYSPHSAA). It is made up of high schools from around the southern portion of the Hudson Valley. The section offers "modified athletics" administration covering grades 7-9 middle school competition in area middle schools (grade 9 is officially part of the high school level). Schools will sometimes compete with other schools outside of the section in tournaments or invitationals. The section is further divided into leagues based on mostly location but also the size of the school. The schools in the section compete with each other over the course of three seasons, fall, winter, and spring.

Sports
The sports administered by all sections of NYSPHSAA are:

Fall Sports

Boys Cross Country
Girls Cross Country
Field Hockey
Football
Boys Gymnastics (Regional)
Girls Gymnastics
Boys Soccer
Girls Soccer
Girls Swimming and Diving
Girls Tennis
Boys Volleyball
Girls Volleyball

Winter Sports

Boys Basketball
Girls Basketball
Boys Bowling
Girls Bowling
Cheer
Boys Ice hockey
Boys Indoor Track and Field
Girls Indoor Track and Field
Rifle
Boys Skiing
Girls Skiing
Boys Swimming and Diving
Boys Volleyball (Regional)
Girls Volleyball (Regional)
Wrestling

Spring Sports

Baseball
Boys Golf
Girls Golf
Boys Lacrosse
Girls Lacrosse
Softball
Boys Tennis
Boys Outdoor Track and Field
Girls Outdoor Track and Field

Leagues
On July 27, 2022. The New York State Public High School Athletic Association (NYSPHSAA) approved the creation of Class AAA after a two-decade hiatus. Roll out of the new classification will begin for the 2023-2024 school year for certain sports.
Football leagues for 2023 season.

Class AAA
 New Rochelle High School
 North Rockland High School
 Arlington High School
 Mt Vernon High School
 White Plains High School
 Port Chester High School/Blind Brook High School

Class AA-1
 New Rochelle High School	
 Mt Vernon High School
 White Plains High School
 Port Chester High School
 Mamaroneck High School
 Ossining High School
 Scarsdale High School
 Yonkers, Saunders Trade/Lincoln/Riverside/Palisade prep
 Yonkers, Gorton/Roosevelt/Montessori Academy/Yonkers

Class AA-2
 Arlington High School
 North Rockland High School
 John Jay Senior High School
 Ketcham High School
 Ramapo High School
 Spring Valley High School
 Suffern High School	
 Carmel High School

Class A
 Fox Lane High School
 Poughkeepsie High School
 Clarkstown High School South (West Nyack, New York)
 Mahopac High School
 Clarkstown High School North (New City, New York)
 Horace Greeley High School
 Harrison High School
 Yorktown High School
 Brewster High School
 Peekskill High School
 Somers High School
 Eastchester High School
 Pelham Memorial High School
 Walter Panas High School
 John Jay High School
 Tappan Zee High School
 Beacon High School
 Lakeland High School
 Nyack High School
 Rye High School

Class B
 Nanuet Senior High School
 Sleepy Hollow High School
 Byram Hills High School
 Pearl River High School
 Ardsley High School
 Hendrick Hudson High School
 Edgemont Junior – Senior High School	
 Hastings High School
 Irvington High School
 Briarcliff High School
 Pleasantville High School

Class C
 Putnam Valley High School
 Rye Neck High School
 Croton-Harmon High School
 Bronxville High School
 Westlake High School
 Woodlands Senior High School
 Albertus Magnus High School
 Blind Brook High School
 Valhalla High School
 Dobbs Ferry High School
 Pawling High School

Class D
 Haldane High School
 Tuckahoe High School

References

External links
 

Organizations based in New York (state)
High school sports associations in the United States
Sports governing bodies in the United States
New York State Public High School Athletic Association sections